Vaanavil Vaazhkai is a 2015 Indian Tamil-language coming-of-age musical film written and directed by James Vasanthan in his directorial debut. He also worked as music composer. The film stars predominantly newcomers who also sing the songs picturised on their characters. It was released on 13 March 2015.

Plot 

Rival bands come together to compete in a national inter-university competition.

Cast 

 Jithin Raj as Jack
 Sai Shankar as Arvind
 Jose Selvaraj as Fayaz
 Jonathan Devadoss as Pramod
 Pavithran as Saravanan
 Shilvi Sharon as Ankita
 Radhika George as Harini
 Maya S. Krishnan as Shweta
 Janani Rajan as Preethi
 Cassandra Rachel as Vinita
 Gaana Siva as Gaana Raja
 Santhosh Cherian as GL Judge
 Josh Mark Raj as GL Judge
 Ilayaraja as Team Folk Singer
 Dr. Joseph Selvaraj as Dr. Parthasarathy
 Aarthi Murali as Prof. Gurupriya
 Prof. Saravanan as Prof. Selvaraj
 Rashna Adhiraj as Jack's mother
 Malic Ibrahim as Jack's mother
 S. Soumya as Preethi's mother
 Sundaresan as Preethi's fother
 Richwin Roy as Harini's brother
 Prof. Karthik as Loyola College Professor
 Aparna as Vinita's friend
 Prajitha as Vinita's friend

Production 
Vaanavil Vaazhkai is the directorial debut of music director James Vasanthan, who wrote the script in six months. For the film's cast, he decided to take newcomers, primarily college students and those from college bands. Among the newcomers were vocalist/guitarist Jithin Raj, Carnatic music-trained Janani Rajan, percussionists Jose Selvaraj and Radhika George, singer Cassandra Rachel, Carnatic singer S. Soumya, and Maya S. Krishnan. It took nearly two years to finalise the lead artistes. James Vasanthan did not learn the basics of filmmaking or work as an assistant director before directing this film, saying "I’m just making a film that I would like to see on screen." He likened it to a "Broadway musical", and said the film would feature the actors singing the songs, as opposed to using playback singers. The film was produced by Oceanaa AJR Cine Arts, and had cinematography by R. K. Prathap.

Soundtrack 
The soundtrack was composed by James Vasanthan. It features 17 songs, all performed by the actors themselves.

Release and reception 
Vaanavil Vaazhkai was released on 13 March 2015. M. Suganth of The Times of India rated the film 1.5 out of 5 stars, saying, "The film is so devoid of excitement that even the final portions, involving the university championship, do not get our pulses racing." Vishal Menon of The Hindu panned the film, saying, "The idea to make a musical is creditable, but VV is a wasted effort. I only wish James had co-directed the film with someone more capable of handling the technical aspects."

References

External links 
 

2010s coming-of-age films
2010s musical films
2010s Tamil-language films
2015 directorial debut films
2015 films
Films scored by James Vasanthan
Indian coming-of-age films
Indian musical films